The  is a river that has both its source and its mouth in the city of Ise, Mie Prefecture, Japan.  The river is notable because it flows through Ise Grand Shrine and, due to its strong association with the Shrine, many songs and poems have been written about it throughout history.  The Uji Bridge serves as the entrance to Ise Grand Shrine, and crosses the Isuzu River.
Isuzu Motors company is named after the river.

References

External links
 (confluence with Seta River)
 Isuzu River - Poems and Dedications

Rivers of Mie Prefecture
Rivers of Japan